Credibility comprises the objective and subjective components of the believability of a source or message. Credibility dates back to Aristotle theory of Rhetoric. Aristotle defines rhetoric as the ability to see what is possibly persuasive in every situation. He divided the means of persuasion into three categories, namely Ethos (the source's credibility), Pathos (the emotional or motivational appeals), and Logos (the logic used to support a claim), which he believed have the capacity to influence the receiver of a message. According to Aristotle, the term "Ethos" deals with the character of the speaker. The intent of the speaker is to appear credible. In fact, the speaker's ethos is a rhetorical strategy employed by an orator whose purpose is to "inspire trust in his audience." Credibility has two key components: trustworthiness and expertise, which both have objective and subjective components. Trustworthiness is based more on subjective factors, but can include objective measurements such as established reliability. Expertise can be similarly subjectively perceived, but also includes relatively objective characteristics of the source or message (e.g., credentials, certification or information quality). Secondary components of credibility include source dynamism (charisma) and physical attractiveness.

Credibility online has become an important topic since the mid-1990s. This is because the web has increasingly become an information resource. The Credibility and Digital Media Project @ UCSB highlights recent and ongoing work in this area, including recent consideration of digital media, youth, and credibility. In addition, the Persuasive Technology Lab at Stanford University has studied web credibility and proposed the principal components of online credibility and a general theory called Prominence-Interpretation Theory.

In journalism
According to the Society of Professional Journalists' code of ethics, professional integrity is the cornerstone of a journalist's credibility.
A journalist's number one obligation is to be honest.

According to Gallup polls, Americans' confidence in the mass media has been consistently declining each year since 2007.

In 2013, a survey conducted by the Pew Research Center for the People & the Press found that credibility ratings for major news organizations are at or near their all-time lows.

"As audiences lose confidence in traditional news outlets, many see great promise in the Internet as a response to this crisis in journalism."

The widespread use of the internet has helped motivate journalists to become more credible. The reason for this is because the competition of providing news increased when consumers had the chance and ability to choose the media that they consume through online sources. The internet has provided a chance for anyone to report news. In order to increase credibility, and therefore increase readers of their articles, journalists should be objective, accurate, trustworthy, and reliable.

Three aspects of credibility: clarity (how easily the article can be understood), accuracy (how well documented the information is), and trustworthiness (how believable the information is).

In academia
Students' perception of instructors has great importance and possible consequences.  Instructor credibility, which is defined as "the attitude of a receiver which references the degree to which a source is seen to be believable", consists of three dimensions-, competence, character, and caring. Competence focuses on his or her expertise or knowledge in a subject matter. Character refers to the "goodness" (i.e., honesty, trustworthiness) of an instructor. Caring focuses on whether the instructor shows concern or empathy for the students' welfare or situation. Although an instructor may show one or two of these qualities, the best and most respected exude all three qualities. A study done by Atkinson and Cooper revealed that students who are taught by an instructor they perceive as credible, results in extreme allegiance to those instructors.

Generally, instructors who are perceived to have credibility are associated with effective teaching skills. Instructors who demonstrate competence, character, and/or caring are perceived to engage in a variety of effective instructional communication behaviors such as argumentativeness, verbal and nonverbal immediacy, affinity seeking, and assertiveness and responsiveness. Moreover, credible instructors are perceived to be low in verbal aggressiveness  and less likely to use behaviors that interfere with student learning.

Unlike instructor competence which centers on instructors' perceived expertise, instructor character and caring are rooted in students' perceptions of their instructors' interpersonal communication behaviors.  Students can feel more connected to the material being taught and have the information stay in their mind, if the instructor sharing the information has credibility.  According to studies, when instructors exemplify the qualities of character (i.e., kind, virtuous, good) and caring (i.e., empathetic, understanding, responsive), students report a greater likelihood of communicating with them.

Teachers who are concerned with whether students communicate with them, either in class or out of class, may want to reconsider the role their own in-class communication behaviors play in students' willingness or likelihood to communicate with them. Instructors who are interested in how students perceive their competence, character, and caring should examine how their in-class communication behaviors contribute to these perceptions. They can evaluate themselves, go back over their lectures, scores that students give them at the end of the semester, and seek advice and training from their peers. By doing so, instructors may find students are more willing, likely, or interested in communicating with them.

In science
Scientific credibility has been defined as the extent to which science in general is recognized as a source of reliable information about the world. The term has also been applied more narrowly, as an assessment of the credibility of the work of an individual scientist or a field of research. Here, the phrase refers to how closely the work in question adheres to scientific principles, such as the scientific method. The method most commonly used to assess the quality of science is peer review and then publication as part of the scientific literature. Other approaches include the collaborative assessment of a topic by a group of experts, this process can produce reviews such as those published by the Cochrane Collaboration, or the Intergovernmental Panel on Climate Change.

The general public can give a great deal of weight to perceptions of scientific authority in their decisions on controversial issues that involve scientific research, such as biotechnology. However, both the credibility and authority of science is questioned by groups with non-mainstream views, such as some advocates of alternative medicine, or those who dispute the scientific consensus on a topic, such as denialists of AIDS and of evolution .

In medicine
People rely on doctors' expertise to respond to issues relating to their health. Trust in a doctor's credibility is essential to a patient's health: depending on the patient's trust in the doctor they will be more or less willing to seek help, reveal sensitive information, submit to treatment, and follow the doctor's recommendations. According to numerous studies, done over 15 years we can conclude that we see a doctor's credibility as having five overlapping characteristics: Fidelity, which is caring and advocating for the patient's interests or welfare and avoiding conflicts of interest; competence, which is having good practice and interpersonal skills, making correct decisions, and avoiding mistakes; honesty, which is telling the truth and avoiding intentional falsehoods; confidentiality, which is proper use of sensitive information; and global trust, which is the irreducible "soul" of trust, or aspects that combine elements from some or all of the separate dimensions.

In general, it is easy to see what patients are looking for when it comes to a trustworthy doctor and the best way they can have their needs satisfied. There does seem to be a growing discontent with the medical field, however, because of for-profit drug companies that are influencing money behind the medical field. In 2002 a doctor attended the hearings of a drug company that was on trial for the death of adolescents who committed suicide while taking their antidepressants. Before the hearing studies had been filed with the FDA under the Best Pharmaceuticals for Children Act of 2002. These studies reflected a congressional effort to motivate drug companies to study the effects of medications on children. Since children are a much smaller market for new drugs, the pharmaceutical industry was suspected to not study them as much. The Best Pharmaceuticals for Children Act of 2002 was meant to strengthen drug companies credibility by rewarding those that performed pediatric studies. The law, however, did not require these pediatric studies performed to be publicized or published 

According to a New England Journal of Medicine study, 94% of American doctors have some relationship with a drug or medical device company, including payments but also drug samples and industry lunches, for example. Such alarming evidence is what has prompted a growing mistrust in medical professionals credibility. Despite the studies conducted intended on finding out how to increase doctors' credibility, the findings are inconclusive. It is a strong general consensus that increased visibility of the relationship between doctors and pharmaceutical companies is the first place to start.

We are seeing some progress towards transparency. The US Open Payments Act (Physician Payments Sunshine Act) has from October 2014 required drug companies to disclose payments to doctors, but it's still does not give total transparency. There is a long way to go in establishing trust and credibility behind what the doctors recommend to patients. Being honest and showing that they are acting off their expertise instead of motivated by incentives given by pharmaceutical companies.

In the Web 

In case of the Web pages, vast majority of researchers identifies two key components of credibility:
 Trustworthiness - related to well-intentioned, truthful, unbiased information and perceived goodness or morality of the source.
 Expertise - connected with such terms as knowledgeable, experienced, competent and captures the perceived knowledge and skill of the source.

On the street
Street credibility or "street cred" is the degree to which someone's word can be believed by a typical person, the "person on the street". Corporations have gone through their own ways of getting street credibility; however, it goes by a different name: branding. This is a process in which companies spend billions of dollars a year and it is meant to convey information about a product, who is using it, and why others should also. They are targeting certain individuals as to increase their ability to grow their "street cred" so that the sales growth does not end. From clothing like running shoes and jeans to food and alcoholic beverages, branding is used to assist companies improve their street cred and better sell a product.

The CEO of the company is the face of what the public sees. A CEO helps illustrate the organization's internal and external shareholders. CEOs are spokesmen who are actively visible and shape the corporate image. The role of the CEO is to influence employees' attitudes, perceptions, and performances through example of leadership and support.

In business leadership

CEO credibility is made up of two factors: knowing what one is talking about, or expertise; and being able to be trusted, or trustworthiness. One of the ways that a CEO's expertise is measured is by the way his/her employees perceive them. If the CEO is seen as someone to whom the senior employees can go to for knowledge and help, this goes to show they have confidence that the CEO holds the skills necessary to help, and is thus valued in their position as such. The extent to which the employee gives their confidence to the CEO determines the CEO's trustworthiness. An employee may totally embrace or quietly set aside the message of the CEO, these results measure the degree of trustworthiness there is in the CEO. The whole reputation of the organization represented by the CEO is built mainly by the experience of the employees as time passes. This reputation is carefully built by many factors experienced by the employees such as the actual services or products sphere, social aspects related to work and the overall foresight and ability to lead in a successful manner.

There is a natural connection link between the CEO and the organization. A CEO's credibility affects how employees view the organization's image. Employees who perceive the CEO as more qualified, competent, knowledgeable, and possessing more expertise and skills tend to view the organizational reputation more positively. Employees who view the CEO as more honest and trustworthy tend to evaluate the organization in a positive manner.

The employees view of the organization completely intervenes the positive relationship between the CEO credibility and the employee's involvement of engagement. Although the CEO's credibility positively affects employee engagement, the actual impact is exercised by the employee's view of the organization's reputation.

In Social Media 
Social media credibility is dependent on cues and heuristics. Cues used to assess credibility online are Authority cues, Identity Cues, and Bandwagon cues.
Authority Cues are the most influence source credibility. Authority cues are cues that let the viewer know that it is an expert source such as a University or Government Institution.
Identity cues are peer information. Users trust information more if they can identify the person that published it the publisher is not anonymous. Users view information as more credible if a peer shared it than a stranger. 
Bandwagon cues triggers credibility processing based on the logic that "if others think it's good, so should I.

Two-phase model of credibility 
Jürgen Habermas in his theory of communicative action developed four validity claims (truth, sincerity, appropriateness and understandability) leading to the concept of credibility.

In a different study researchers empirically validated the claims and derived a two-phase model of "reporting credibility", where first of all understandability needs to be reached. Only then the three other validity claims make a difference and may lead to credibility in the Habermasian sense.

See also
 Centre for Research on the Epidemiology of Disasters (CRED)
 Credibility gap
 Credibility theory
 Credibility thesis
 Epistemology, the philosophical study of truth and belief
 Expertise finding
 Indie cred
 Integrity
 Objectivity
 Source credibility from social psychology theory
 Source criticism
 Web literacy (credibility)
 Witness

References

External links

 Handbook of Management Scales: Credibility
 College students' news habits, preferences, and credibility perceptions

Belief
Popular culture